Where the Action's At! is a live album by organist Jimmy McGriff recorded in New Jersey and released on Veep label in 1966.

Reception
Flophouse magazine stated "Production-wise, the album may be so-so, the drums sounding muffled, but as far as the standard of playing is concerned, it’s a gem!".

Track listing 
All compositions by Jimmy McGriff except where noted
 "Where It's At" – 4:32
 "When Johnny Comes Marching Home" (Traditional) – 4:00
 "Up Tight" (Stevie Wonder, Sylvia Moy, Henry Cosby) – 5:48
 "Frugal Bugle" – 6:28
 "Upper-Ground" – 5:00
 "Georgia on My Mind" (Hoagy Carmichael) – 5:40
 "Goin' Out of My Head" (Bobby Weinstein, Teddy Randazzo) – 3:58
 "Robbins Nest" (Illinois Jacquet Sir Charles Thompson) – 5:08

Personnel 
Jimmy McGriff – organ
Thornel Schwartz – guitar
Willie "Saint" Jenkins – drums

References 

1966 live albums
Jimmy McGriff live albums
United Artists Records live albums
Albums produced by Sonny Lester